Medero is a surname. Notable people with the surname include:

Benito Medero (1922–2007), Uruguayan politician
Luis Medero (born 1973), Argentine footballer

See also
Mederos
Mederow